Fuchibotulus is a genus of South African and Mozambican araneomorph spiders in the family Trachelidae, first described by C. R. Haddad & R. Lyle in 2008.  it contains only three species.

References

External links

Araneomorphae genera
Trachelidae